Aiyura Airport  is an airstrip in Aiyura, in the Eastern Highlands Province of Papua New Guinea. It is the main air field for Summer Institute of Linguistics (SIL). The pilots and mechanics who work out of Aiyura Airport live in the nearby SIL town of Ukarumpa.

References

External links
 

Airports in Papua New Guinea
Eastern Highlands Province